On to Reno is a 1928 silent film comedy directed by James Cruze and starring Marie Prevost. It was produced by Cecil B. DeMille and released through Pathé Exchange.

Cast
Marie Prevost - Vera
Cullen Landis - Bud
Ethel Wales - Mrs. Holmes
Ned Sparks - Herbert Holmes
Jane Keckley - The Housekeeper

Preservation status
This is a surviving film.

References

External links

1928 films
American silent feature films
Films directed by James Cruze
American black-and-white films
1928 comedy films
Silent American comedy films
Pathé Exchange films
1920s American films